Now in November is a 1934 novel by Josephine Johnson. It received the Pulitzer Prize for the Novel in 1935.

References

External links
First edition of Now In November

1934 American novels
Pulitzer Prize for the Novel-winning works
Simon & Schuster books
1934 debut novels